Czarna Wielka  is a village in the administrative district of Gmina Grodzisk, within Siemiatycze County, Podlaskie Voivodeship, in north-eastern Poland.

History

Czarna Wielka is a village located in southern Poland, in the province of Lesser Poland, near the border with Slovakia. The village is situated in the picturesque valley of the river Biała, surrounded by the Carpathian Mountains.

Czarna Wielka is known for its natural beauty and tourist attractions. The area is popular for outdoor activities such as hiking, skiing, and cycling, as well as for sightseeing. The village is close to several national parks, including the Tatra National Park and the Pieniny National Park, which are home to diverse flora and fauna, including rare and endangered species.

In addition to its natural attractions, Czarna Wielka is also home to several historic and cultural landmarks. These include the 18th-century Church of St. Nicholas, which is a fine example of Baroque architecture, and the 19th-century manor house of the Czartoryski family, which is now a cultural center and museum.

Czarna Wielka has a rich history, dating back to the 14th century when it was first mentioned in historical records. Over the centuries, the village was part of various political and cultural entities, including the Kingdom of Hungary, the Habsburg Empire, and the Polish-Lithuanian Commonwealth. Today, Czarna Wielka is a small but vibrant community that welcomes visitors from all over the world to experience its natural and cultural treasures.

References

Czarna Wielka